Saint Victor of Marseilles (died c. 290) was an Egyptian Christian martyr. He is venerated as a saint in the Catholic Church and the Eastern Orthodox Church.

Life
Saint Victor is said to have been a Roman army officer in Marseille, who publicly denounced the worship of idols. For that, he was brought before the Roman prefects, Asterius and Eutychius, who later sent him to the Emperor Maximian. He was then racked, beaten, dragged through the streets, and thrown into prison, where he converted three other Roman soldiers, Longinus, Alexander, and Felician, who were subsequently beheaded. After refusing to offer incense to a statue of the Roman god Jupiter, Victor kicked it over with his foot. The emperor ordered that he be put to death by being ground under a millstone, but the millstone broke while Victor was still alive. He was then beheaded.

Veneration

Saint Victor and the three other Roman soldiers he converted – Saints Longinus, Alexander and Felician – were killed near the end of the 3rd century. In the 4th century, Saint John Cassian built a monastery over the site where their bodies had been buried in a cave, which later became a Benedictine abbey and minor basilica.  This is the Abbey of St Victor (Abbaye Saint-Victor).

Saint Victor's feast day, along with Saints Longinus, Alexander and Felician, is celebrated on July 21.

Patronage 
Saint Victor is the patron saint of Tallinn, the capital of Estonia. His life and martyrdom are celebrated in the scenes depicted on the high altar of St. Nicholas' Church, Tallinn.

Notes

External links
Victor of Marseilles

3rd-century births
290 deaths
Ancient Massaliotes
3rd-century Christian martyrs
Gallo-Roman saints